Glyptelasma hamatum is a species of goose barnacle in the family Poecilasmatidae.

Description
G. hamatum is a small stalked barnacle, with a body reaching a length of about 24 mm and a width of about 12.5 mm. The body is covered by 5 smooth white valves which form a keel with a wide base. The stalk (peduncle) that anchors the animal to the substrate is about 5 mm long. In South Africa, it is frequently found attached to the stems of hydrozoans.

Distribution
The species has a cosmopolitan distribution and has been reported worldwide from depths of 366-3,660 m.

References 

Crustaceans described in 1919
Crustaceans of South Africa
Barnacles